Pittsfield Municipal Airport  is a town owned, public use airport located one nautical mile (2 km) southeast of the central business district of Pittsfield, a town in Somerset County, Maine, United States. It is included in the National Plan of Integrated Airport Systems for 2011–2015, which categorized it as a general aviation facility.

Facilities and aircraft 
Pittsfield Municipal Airport covers an area of 325 acres (132 ha) at an elevation of 197 feet (60 m) above mean sea level. It has one runway designated 18/36 with an asphalt surface measuring 4,003 by 100 feet (1,220 x 30 m).

For the 12-month period ending August 13, 2011, the airport had 8,700 aircraft operations, an average of 23 per day: 99% general aviation and 1% air taxi.
At that time there were 43 aircraft based at this airport: 77% single-engine, 14% multi-engine, and 9% glider.

See also 
 List of airports in Maine

References

External links 
 Airport page at Town of Pittsfield website
 Curtis Air, the fixed-base operator (FBO)
 Aerial image as of May 1996 from USGS The National Map
 
 

Airports in Somerset County, Maine
Pittsfield, Maine